Two Bavarians in the Jungle is a 1957 West German comedy film directed by Ludwig Bender and starring Joe Stöckel, Beppo Brem and Lucie Englisch. It is a sequel to the 1956 hit Two Bavarians in St. Pauli.

Cast
 Joe Stöckel as Jonathan Ratzenstaller
 Beppo Brem as Michl Moosrainer
 Lucie Englisch as Emerenzia Ratzenstaller
 Maria Stadler as Kuni Moosrainer
 Hubert von Meyerinck as Jawassis
 Fritz Strassner as Xaver Huber
 Anne-Marie Kolb as Ria Huber
 Bert Fortell as Toni Gschwendner
 Georg Bauer as Gschwendner
 Jean Pierre Faye as Das Narbengesicht
 Franz Fröhlich as Ortspolizist
 Bertl Schultes
 Ruth Stephan as Lilo Knopke

References

Bibliography 
 Beni Eppenberger & Daniel Stapfer. Mädchen, Machos und Moneten: die unglaubliche Geschichte des SchweizerKinounternehmers Erwin C. Dietrich. Verlag Scharfe Stiefel, 2006.

External links 
 

1957 films
West German films
German comedy films
1957 comedy films
1950s German-language films
Films directed by Ludwig Bender
Films set in Africa
Films about race and ethnicity
UFA GmbH films
1950s German films